PRY may refer to:

 Paraguay
 Perry Barr railway station, England; National Rail station code PRY
  IATA, code for Wonderboom Airport in Pretoria, South Africa
 Pry (software), Read, Evaluate, and Print Ruby code
 Polycystin-related Y protein (PRY), found within the Y chromosome

See also 
 Pry (disambiguation)